Henry Phillips (born November 14, 1969) is a musical comedian from Los Angeles known for his Comedy Central Presents special, his songs for two award-winning musicals, Blake: the Musical and Chips, and for co-writing and starring in the semi-autobiographical movie Punching the Clown which won several awards, most notably the Audience Award at the Slamdance Film Festival and is critically acclaimed, currently holding an 86% fresh rating on the review aggregator site Rotten Tomatoes. His series of satirical YouTube cooking videos called "Henry's Kitchen", in which he tries to cook food, make friends, and impress women, was described by Sarah Silverman as "the best cooking show ever", and his other web series "You and Your Fu*king Coffee" was produced by Jash and features well-known guest stars including Mike Judge and Ashley Johnson.

Phillips has appeared on Jimmy Kimmel Live!, Bob and Tom, The Dr. Demento Radio Show, and the podcasts WTF with Marc Maron, Comedy Bang! Bang! and The World Record Podcast with Brendan Walsh.

In 2014 he recorded his first one hour comedy special, at Hollywood's The Lyric Theater. In 2016, he co-wrote and starred in Punching Henry, a sequel to Punching the Clown. From 2016 to 2019 he had a recurring supporting role as John Stafford in the TV series Silicon Valley.

Style
Phillips typically portrays a character that is a classic loser, hapless with women, and unsuccessful in show business. His musical style is frequently in ballad form where the sincerity of the musical style contrasts with the comically sad/angry/absurd lyrics. He has also said he wouldn't be doing stand-up if not for Doug Stanhope, who got him started on the road (Phillips appears on Doug Stanhope's 2000 album Something to Take the Edge Off).

Background
Phillips grew up in New Jersey and moved to Los Angeles as a kid when his father, the character actor Bill Wiley, got work in the city.

Discography
On the Shoulders of Freaks (1997)
Number 2 (1999)
Why Haven't I Heard From You CD (2005)
L.A. Dream CD (2010)
Neither Here Nor There (2016)

References

External links
 

1969 births
Living people
20th-century American comedians
21st-century American comedians